Orophia pachystoma is a species of moth in the family Depressariidae. It was described by Edward Meyrick in 1921. It is found in Zimbabwe.

References

Endemic fauna of Zimbabwe
Orophia
Lepidoptera of Zimbabwe
Moths of Sub-Saharan Africa
Moths described in 1921